Peter Mosbacher (1912–1977) was a German stage, film and television actor.

Filmography

References

Bibliography
 Goble, Alan. The Complete Index to Literary Sources in Film. Walter de Gruyter, 1999.

External links

1912 births
1977 deaths
German male stage actors
German male television actors
German male film actors
20th-century German male actors
Actors from Mannheim